The Orto Botanico Riserva Lago di Penne (1 hectare) is a botanical garden located within the Riserva Lago di Penne, southwest of Penne, Abruzzo, central Italy. The garden was established in 1989, and contains plants organized by geography and ecological system.

See also 
 List of botanical gardens in Italy

References 
 Official website 
 Info-abruzzo.it description 

Botanical gardens in Italy
Gardens in Abruzzo
1989 establishments in Italy